Darren Anthony Roberts (born 12 October 1969) is an English former football striker.

He scored a first-half hat-trick in his Football League debut for Wolverhampton Wanderers in the 4–0 victory over Birmingham City in a live televised match in 1992.

Roberts finished his playing career in September 2013, playing his part in helping Seaford United secure the Victorian State League Division 4 South championship, the club's first senior men's title in 27 years.

References

External links

Profile at UpThePosh! The Peterborough United Database

1969 births
Living people
Footballers from Birmingham, West Midlands
English footballers
Association football forwards
Burton Albion F.C. players
Wolverhampton Wanderers F.C. players
Hereford United F.C. players
Doncaster Rovers F.C. players
Chesterfield F.C. players
Darlington F.C. players
Peterborough United F.C. players
Scarborough F.C. players
Exeter City F.C. players
Barrow A.F.C. players
Tamworth F.C. players
Worksop Town F.C. players
Belper Town F.C. players
Kidsgrove Athletic F.C. players
Farsley Celtic A.F.C. players
Glapwell F.C. players
Sutton Coldfield Town F.C. players
English Football League players